The Ibăneasa is a left tributary of the river Jijia in Romania. It discharges into the Jijia in Borzești. It flows through the villages Ibănești, Dragalina, George Enescu, Dumeni, Cordăreni, Ibăneasa and Borzești.

References

Rivers of Romania
Rivers of Botoșani County